Joseph Arthur Campanella (September 3, 1930February 15, 1967) was a professional American football player who played linebacker for six seasons for the Cleveland Browns and the Baltimore Colts.

After retiring from professional football, Campanella, at the encouragement of Carroll Rosenbloom, the owner of the Baltimore Colts, pooled his money with Alan Ameche and Louis Fischer, who was Campanella's classmate from Ohio State, and they became early investors in some restaurants.   The first store, called "Ameche’s Drive-In" in Glen Burnie, Maryland, featured the Powerhouse and Kingfish sandwiches served with the Special "35" Sauce. The number of stores slowly grew beyond the flagship drive-in.

In the early 1960s Ameche, Fischer and Campanella wanted to expand, so they started looking for a fourth partner.  They had approached and been turned down several times by Gino Marchetti, the All Pro defensive lineman.  Marchetti had decided that when he retired he would return to California to join his brothers at a gas station in Alameda, in the Bay Area.

Campanella left the group in 1963 and started his own restaurant, Rustler Steak House, and later sold it after opening five stores and returned to work with his partners after less than a year. The restaurant later changed hands including Marriott Corporation selling it to Tenly Enterprises in 1973, and it was later sold in 1985 to Collins Foods.

In 1966, after Don Kellett retired as General Manager of the Colts, Carroll Rosenbloom invited Joe to re-join the football team as the VP and General Manager.  Although it was a career shift back into sports, Campanella decided to follow his heart, and he accepted the job.  One reason for the decision was that Campanella had a great deal of respect and admiration for the coach, Don Shula.[2]

Death
Campanella's sudden and untimely death occurred in February 1967: he was 36.  Joe had stayed physically active, often running or playing ball with friends.  All that ended several months after beginning his stint as General Manager of the Colts.  Campanella was playing a friendly round of handball with Don Shula and a buddy at the Downtown Athletic Club when he became short of breath and asked to stop. After stumbling, Campanella said he had to get off the court.  He never made it, dying in Shula's arms. At the time doctors thought it was a heart attack.  Rosenbloom and the entire Colt organization were in shock.  Don Shula tearfully remarked, "He was just a wonderful human being; one of my closest friends."  Gino Marchetti was overcome with grief at Campanella's funeral, saying: "If I live to be 100, I will never meet a better friend.  He showed me the right directions to go: in business, and spiritually by bringing me back to the church. He meant to me what air means to the body. If you want to know what a real man is like, well man, he was!"

References

1930 births
1967 deaths
American football linebackers
American football offensive tackles
Baltimore Colts announcers
Baltimore Colts executives
Baltimore Colts players
Dallas Texans (NFL) players
National Football League announcers
National Football League general managers
Ohio State Buckeyes football players
Players of American football from Cleveland
Sportspeople from Cleveland
Sports deaths in Maryland